Mansour Boutabout (born 20 September 1978) is a former professional footballer who played as a forward. Born in France, he spent most of his career there while representing the Algeria national team at international level.

Club career
Boutabout was born in Le Creusot, France.

In February 2010 he signed for USM Blida from Belgian club K.V. Kortrijk and spent a season there. After receiving a contract offer from Championnat National side UJA Alfortville he trialled a few weeks with reigning Scottish Premier League champions Rangers upon the invitation of compatriot Madjid Bougherra.

On 14 March 2011, it was announced that Boutabout had joined Réunion-club AS Excelsior. where he joined up with Algerian coach Farès Bousdira.

International career
Boutabout received his first call-up to the Algeria national team for a 2006 FIFA World Cup qualifier against Niger on 11 October 2003. He started the game and scored its only goal in the 62nd minute. A month later, he scored another two goals in the 6–0 win in the return leg against Niger.

Boutabout was subsequently called up to be part of the 2004 African Cup of Nations in Tunisia where he started three games in the competition without scoring a goal before the team lost in the quarter-finals to Morocco.

Boutabout's last cap came on 26 March 2008, in a friendly against DR Congo.

Career statistics

Scores and results list Algeria's goal tally first, score column indicates score after each Boutabout goal.

References

External links
 
 

Living people
1978 births
French sportspeople of Algerian descent
Sportspeople from Le Creusot
Algerian footballers
French footballers
Association football forwards
Algeria international footballers
2004 African Cup of Nations players
Ligue 1 players
Ligue 2 players
Belgian Pro League players
FC Gueugnon players
FC Sète 34 players
Le Mans FC players
CS Sedan Ardennes players
Angers SCO players
K.V. Kortrijk players
USM Blida players
AS Excelsior players
Rodez AF players
US Colomiers Football players
Algerian expatriate footballers
Algerian expatriate sportspeople in Belgium
French expatriate footballers
French expatriate sportspeople in Belgium
Expatriate footballers in Belgium
Footballers from Bourgogne-Franche-Comté